The Men's 10 km competition of the open water swimming events at the 2015 World Aquatics Championships was held on 27 July 2015. The top ten swimmers qualified for 10 km marathon at the 2016 Summer Olympics.

Results
The race was started at 12:00.

References

Men's 10 km
World Aquatics Championships